August is a 2008 American drama film directed by Austin Chick and presented by 57th & Irving. The screenplay by Howard A. Rodman focuses on two brothers, ambitious dot-com entrepreneurs attempting to keep their company afloat as the stock market begins to collapse in August 2001, one month prior to the 9/11 attacks.

The film premiered as an official selection of the Spectrum section at the 2008 Sundance Film Festival.

Plot
Tom and Joshua Sterling are brothers whose Internet startup company, Landshark, is as hot as a New York City summer – only this is the summer of 2001, their company is in lock up, its stock price is plunging and, in a few weeks, the world will change forever.

In the meantime, Tom is living the hedonistic life of an Internet star; he dates multiple women, drives a 67 Camaro convertible and hangs out at a new club called Bungalow 8. Tom Sterling is a true showman, a demigod in a cult – and culture – of personality.

Cast 
 Josh Hartnett as Tom Sterling
 Naomie Harris as Sarah
 Adam Scott as Joshua Sterling
 Robin Tunney as Melanie Hanson
 Andre Royo as Dylan Gottschalk
 Emmanuelle Chriqui as Morella Sterling
 Laila Robins as Ottmar Peevo
 Caroline Lagerfelt as Nancy Sterling
 Alan Cox as Burton
 John Lavelle as Brad
 David Bowie as Cyrus Ogilvie
 Rip Torn as David Sterling

Festival screenings

Critical reception
Rotten Tomatoes gives the film 36% based on 25 reviews, with a consensus that "Josh Hartnett puts in a well-intentioned performance but overall, August only superficially explores its dotcom-burst setting." Metacritic reported the film had an average score of 39 out of 100 based on 10 reviews, indicating a generally negative response.

References

External links

 
August at the Movie Review Query Engine
International Sales (ContentFilm)

2008 films
American drama films
2008 drama films
2000s English-language films
Films set in 2001
2000s American films